Sarcopterygii — sometimes considered synonymous with Crossopterygii — is a taxon (traditionally a class or subclass) of the bony fishes known as the lobe-finned fishes. The group Tetrapoda, a mostly terrestrial superclass including amphibians, sauropsids (reptiles, including dinosaurs and therefore birds) and synapsids (with mammals being the only extant group), evolved from certain sarcopterygians; under a cladistic view, tetrapods are themselves considered a subgroup within Sarcopterygii.

The known extant non-tetrapod sarcopterygians include two species of coelacanths and six species of lungfishes.

Characteristics

Early lobe-finned fishes are bony fish with fleshy, lobed, paired fins, which are joined to the body by a single bone. The fins of lobe-finned fishes differ from those of all other fish in that each is borne on a fleshy, lobelike, scaly stalk extending from the body. The scales of sarcopterygians are true scaloids, consisting of lamellar bone surrounded by layers of vascular bone, dentine-like cosmine, and external keratin. The morphology of tetrapodomorphs, fish that are similar-looking to tetrapods, give indications of the transition from water to terrestrial life. Pectoral and pelvic fins have articulations resembling those of tetrapod limbs. The first tetrapod land vertebrates, basal amphibian organisms, possessed legs derived from these fins. Sarcopterygians also possess two dorsal fins with separate bases, as opposed to the single dorsal fin of actinopterygians (ray-finned fish). The braincase of sarcopterygians primitively has a hinge line, but this is lost in tetrapods and lungfish. Many early sarcopterygians have a symmetrical tail. All sarcopterygians possess teeth covered with true enamel.

Most species of lobe-finned fishes are extinct. The largest known lobe-finned fish was Rhizodus hibberti from the Carboniferous period of Scotland which may have exceeded 7 meters in length. Among the two groups of extant (living) species, the coelacanths and the lungfishes, the largest species is the West Indian Ocean coelacanth, reaching  in length and weighing up .

Classification

Taxonomists who subscribe to the cladistic approach include the grouping Tetrapoda within this group, which in turn consists of all species of four-limbed vertebrates. The fin-limbs of lobe-finned fishes such as the coelacanths show a strong similarity to the expected ancestral form of tetrapod limbs. The lobe-finned fishes apparently followed two different lines of development and are accordingly separated into two subclasses, the Rhipidistia (including the Dipnoi, the lungfish, and the Tetrapodomorpha which include the Tetrapoda) and the Actinistia (coelacanths).

Taxonomy
The classification below follows Benton (2004), and uses a synthesis of rank-based Linnaean taxonomy and also reflects evolutionary relationships. Benton included the Superclass Tetrapoda in the Subclass Sarcopterygii in order to reflect the direct descent of tetrapods from lobe-finned fish, despite the former being assigned a higher taxonomic rank.

 Subclass Sarcopterygii
 †Order Onychodontida
 Order Actinistia
 Infraclass Dipnomorpha
 †Order Porolepiformes
 Subclass Dipnoi
 Order Ceratodontiformes
 Order Lepidosireniformes
 Infraclass Tetrapodomorpha
 †Order Rhizodontida
 Superorder Osteolepidida
 †Order Osteolepiformes
 †Family Tristichopteridae
 †Order Panderichthyida
 Superclass Tetrapoda

Phylogeny
The cladogram presented below is based on studies compiled by Janvier et al. (1997) for the Tree of Life Web Project, Mikko's Phylogeny Archive and Swartz (2012).

 Sarcopterygii incertae sedis
†Guiyu oneiros Zhu et al., 2009
†Diabolepis speratus (Chang & Yu, 1984)
†Langdenia campylognatha Janvier & Phuong, 1999
†Ligulalepis Schultze, 1968
†Meemannia eos Zhu, Yu, Wang, Zhao & Jia, 2006
†Psarolepis romeri Yu 1998 sensu Zhu, Yu, Wang, Zhao & Jia, 2006
†Megamastax ambylodus Choo, Zhu, Zhao, Jia, & Zhu, 2014
†Sparalepis tingi Choo, Zhu, Qu, Yu, Jia & Zhaoh, 2017

 paraphyletic Osteolepida incertae sedis|
†Bogdanovia orientalis Obrucheva 1955 [has been treated as Coelacanthinimorph sarcopterygian]
†Canningius groenlandicus Säve-Söderbergh, 1937
†Chrysolepis
†Geiserolepis 
†Latvius 
†L. grewingki (Gross, 1933)
†L. porosus Jarvik, 1948
†L. obrutus Vorobyeva, 1977
†Lohsania utahensis Vaughn, 1962
†Megadonichthys kurikae Vorobyeva, 1962
†Platyethmoidia antarctica Young, Long & Ritchie, 1992
†Shirolepis ananjevi Vorobeva, 1977
†Sterropterygion brandei Thomson, 1972
†Thaumatolepis edelsteini Obruchev, 1941
†Thysanolepis micans Vorobyeva, 1977
†Vorobjevaia dolonodon Young, Long & Ritchie, 1992
 paraphyletic Elpistostegalia/Panderichthyida incertae sedis
†Parapanderichthys stolbovi (Vorobyeva, 1960) Vorobyeva, 1992
†Howittichthys warrenae Long & Holland, 2008
†Livoniana multidentata Ahlberg, Luksevic & Mark-Kurik, 2000
 Stegocephalia incertae sedis
†Antlerpeton clarkii Thomson, Shubin & Poole, 1998
†Austrobrachyops jenseni Colbert & Cosgriff, 1974
†Broilisaurus raniceps (Goldenberg, 1873) Kuhn, 1938
†Densignathus rowei Daeschler, 2000
†Doragnathus woodi Smithson, 1980
†Jakubsonia livnensis Lebedev, 2004
†Limnerpeton dubium Fritsch, 1901 (nomen dubium)
†Limnosceloides Romer, 1952
†L. dunkardensis Romer, 1952 (Type)
†L. brahycoles Langston, 1966
†Occidens portlocki Clack & Ahlberg, 2004
†Ossinodus puerorum emend Warren & Turner, 2004
†Romeriscus periallus Baird & Carroll, 1968
†Sigournea multidentata Bolt & Lombard, 2006
†Sinostega pani Zhu et al., 2002
†Ymeria denticulata Clack et al., 2012

Evolution

Lobe-finned fishes (sarcopterygians) and their relatives the ray-finned fishes (actinopterygians) comprise the superclass of bony fishes (Osteichthyes) characterized by their bony skeleton rather than cartilage. There are otherwise vast differences in fin, respiratory, and circulatory structures between the Sarcopterygii and the Actinopterygii, such as the presence of cosmoid layers in the scales of sarcopterygians. The earliest fossils of sarcopterygians were found in the uppermost Silurian, about 418 Ma (million years ago). They closely resembled the acanthodians (the "spiny fish", a taxon that became extinct at the end of the Paleozoic). In the early–middle Devonian (416–385 Ma), while the predatory placoderms dominated the seas, some sarcopterygians came into freshwater habitats.

In the Early Devonian (416–397 Ma), the sarcopterygians split into two main lineages: the coelacanths and the rhipidistians. Coelacanths never left the oceans and their heyday was the late Devonian and Carboniferous, from 385 to 299 Ma, as they were more common during those periods than in any other period in the Phanerozoic. Coelacanths of the genus Latimeria still live today in the open (pelagic) oceans.

The Rhipidistians, whose ancestors probably lived in the oceans near the river mouths (estuaries), left the ocean world and migrated into freshwater habitats. In turn, they split into two major groups: lungfish and the tetrapodomorphs. Lungfish radiated into their greatest diversity during the Triassic period; today fewer than a dozen genera remain. They evolved the first proto-lungs and proto-limbs, adapting to living outside a submerged water environment by the middle Devonian (397–385 Ma).

Hypotheses for means of pre-adaption
There are three major hypotheses as to how lungfish evolved their stubby fins (proto-limbs).

Shrinking waterhole The first, traditional explanation is the "shrinking waterhole hypothesis", or "desert hypothesis", posited by the American paleontologist Alfred Romer, who believed that limbs and lungs may have evolved from the necessity of having to find new bodies of water as old waterholes dried up.

Inter-tidal adaption Niedźwiedzki, Szrek, Narkiewicz, et al. (2010) proposed a second, the "inter-tidal hypothesis": That sarcopterygians may have first emerged unto land from intertidal zones rather than inland bodies of water, based on the discovery of the 395 million-year-old Zachełmie tracks in Zachełmie, Świętokrzyskie Voivodeship, Poland, the oldest discovered fossil evidence of tetrapods.

Woodland swamp adaption Retallack (2011) proposed a third hypothesis is dubbed the "woodland hypothesis": Retallack argues that limbs may have developed in shallow bodies of water, in woodlands, as a means of navigating in environments filled with roots and vegetation. He based his conclusions on the evidence that transitional tetrapod fossils are consistently found in habitats that were formerly humid and wooded floodplains.

Habitual escape onto land A fourth, minority hypothesis posits that advancing onto land achieved more safety from predators, less competition for prey, and certain environmental advantages not found in water—such as oxygen concentration, and temperature control—implying that organisms developing limbs were also adapting to spending some of their time out of water. However, studies have found that sarcopterygians developed tetrapod-like limbs suitable for walking well before venturing onto land. This suggests they adapted to walking on the ground-bed under water before they advanced onto dry land.

History through to the end-Permian extinction
The first tetrapodomorphs, which included the gigantic rhizodonts, had the same general anatomy as the lungfish, who were their closest kin, but they appear not to have left their water habitat until the late Devonian epoch (385–359 Ma), with the appearance of tetrapods (four-legged vertebrates). Tetrapods are the only tetrapodomorphs which survived after the Devonian.

Non-tetrapod sarcopterygians continued until towards the end of Paleozoic era, suffering heavy losses during the Permian–Triassic extinction event (251 Ma).

See also
 List of sarcopterygian genera
 Cladistic Classification of Class Sarcopterygii

Footnotes

References

 

 
Fish classes
Silurian bony fish
Extant Silurian first appearances
Pridoli first appearances
Taxa described in 1955
Taxa named by Alfred Romer